Brooke E. Flammang is an American biologist at the New Jersey Institute of Technology. She specializes in functional morphology, biomechanics, and bioinspired technology of fishes. 
Flammang is a discoverer of the radialis muscle in shark tails. She also studies the adhesive disc of the remora, and the walking cavefish, Cryptotora thamicola. Her work has been profiled by major news outlets including The New York Times, The Washington Post, Wired, BBC Radio 5, Discovery Channel, and National Geographic Wild. She was named one of the "best shark scientists to follow" by Scientific American in 2014.

Education 
Flammang received her M.S. in marine science from  Moss Landing Marine Laboratories at  California State University Monterey Bay  where she was in the Gregor Cailliet lab studying the distribution and reproductive ecology of deepsea catsharks from the family Scyliorhinidae of the Eastern Pacific. She completed her Ph.D. in biology and a postdoctoral fellowship at Harvard University, where she worked with George V. Lauder on a variety of projects, such as fluid dynamics and volumetric imaging of fish locomotion, bioinspired robotics, and bluegill sunfish and shark functional morphology and locomotion.

Academic career
Flammang was a postdoctoral research fellow in the Department of Organismic and Evolutionary Biology (2010–2013) and a faculty member in the Division of Continuing Education (2009–2014) at Harvard University. She subsequently was an assistant professor at Lasell College's Department of Science and Mathematics (2013–2014) as well as a visiting scholar at the Museum of Comparative Zoology at Harvard University (2013–2014). She has served as assistant professor in the Federated Department of Biology at the New Jersey Institute of Technology (2014–2021) and currently serving as associate professor (2021–Present). She also holds appointments as a Harvard University Museum of Comparative Zoology Associate of Ichthyology and as a graduate faculty member at Rutgers University.

Research 
Flammang discovered the radialis muscle in shark tails while at the Friday Harbor Laboratories for a summer course with Adam Summers, Beth Brainerd and Karel Liem. Her current research focuses on the remora adhesive disc, from describing its function and morphology to understanding the  hydrodynamics and mechanism of its attachment. She also works on the walking cavefish, Cryptotora thamicola, to understand the unique morphological adaptations found in  walking fishes. Her work has been profiled by the New York Times, the Washington Post,
Wired,
You're the Expert radio show,
BBC Radio 5, 
CBC Radio,
Discovery Channel, 
and National Geographic Wild
She was named one of the "best shark scientists to follow" by Scientific American in 2014.

She has made advances to the use of 3D Particle Image Velocimetry for understanding the fluid dynamics of locomotion in fish. Her lab focuses on functional morphology and comparative biomechanics, along with bioinspired robotics, the evolution of tetrapods, and the fluid dynamics of swimming.

Most cited papers 
 Esposito C. J., Tangorra J. L., Flammang B. E., Lauder G. V. (2012), A robotic fish caudal fin: effects of stiffness and motor program on locomotor performance. Journal of Experimental Biologyl 215:56 LP – 67.  According to Google Scholar, this paper has been cited 196 times.
 Flammang BE, Lauder GV. Caudal fin shape modulation and control during acceleration, braking and backing maneuvers in bluegill sunfish, Lepomis macrochirus. Journal of Experimental Biology. 2009 Jan 15;212(2):277-86. According to  Google Scholar, this paper has been cited 114 times.
 Flammang B. E., Lauder G. V., Troolin D. R. and Strand T. E. (2011), Volumetric imaging of fish locomotion. 7. Biology Letters doi.org/10.1098/rsbl.2011.0282 According to  Google Scholar, this paper has been cited 81 times.
 Flammang BE, Lauder GV. Speed-dependent intrinsic caudal muscle recruitment during steady swimming in bluegill sunfish, Lepomis macrochirus. Journal of Experimental Biology. 2008 Feb 15;211(4):587-98. According to  Google Scholar, this paper has been cited 78 times.
 Flammang, B. E. (2010), Functional morphology of the radialis muscle in shark tails. Journal of Morphology., 271: 340–352. doi:10.1002/jmor.10801
 Flammang B. E., Suvarnaraksha A, Markiewicz J, Soares D. (2016), Tetrapod-like pelvic girdle in a walking cavefish. Science Reports 6:23711. This paper demonstrated how Cryptotora thamicola walks and climbs waterfalls with a tetrapodal gait and has a pelvic girdle with morphological features consistent with terrestrial vertebrates.

Awards 
Flammang is the principal investigator for a National Science Foundation (NSF) Rules of Life RAISE grant to address the evolution of terrestrial locomotion. She has been recognized by the Journal of Experimental Biology as an Early Career Researcher of note, and was awarded the Dorothy M. Skinner Award in 2013 by the Society for Integrative and Comparative Biology. In 2017, she was awarded the Carl Gans Award by the Society for Integrative and Comparative Biology. She was the 2019 recipient of the Bioinspiration and Biomimetics Steven Vogel Young Investigator Award. as well as the 2019 recipient of the NJIT CSLA Rising Star Research Award.

References

External links
Web page at NJIT

American women biologists
New Jersey Institute of Technology faculty
California State University, Monterey Bay alumni
Harvard University alumni
Lasell College faculty
Year of birth missing (living people)
Living people
American women academics
21st-century American women